Francis I. Parker (August 21, 1923 – March 5, 2008) was an American judge. He was an associate justice of the North Carolina Supreme Court.

Life and career 
Parker was born in Charlotte, North Carolina, the son of John J. Parker, a judge. He attended Woodberry Forest School and the University of North Carolina. He served in the United States Navy during World War II and the Korean conflict.

In 1986, Parker was appointed by Governor James G. Martin to serve as an associate justice of the North Carolina Supreme Court.

Parker died in March 2008, at the age of 84.

References 

1923 births
2008 deaths
People from Charlotte, North Carolina
Justices of the North Carolina Supreme Court
20th-century American judges
University of North Carolina alumni